Marko Savić (born June 2, 1987) is a Serbian professional basketball player who is currently ranked world No. 2 in men's individual 3x3 rankings by the International Basketball Federation (FIBA). He plays for Novi Sad Al-Wahda and Serbia men's national 3x3 team.

3x3 basketball career 
Savić started to play at the FIBA 3X3 World Tour in August 2012 with his childhood friends and current teammates Dušan Domović Bulut and Marko Ždero. He plays for United Arab Emirates based team Novi Sad Al-Wahda and won two FIBA 3x3 World Tours.

Serbia national team 
Savić represents Serbia in 3x3 basketball. He won three gold medals at the FIBA 3x3 World Championships (2012 in Greece, 2016 in China and 2017 in France) and silver medal at the 2014 tournament in Russia.

Awards and accomplishments 
 FIBA 3x3 World Tour winner: 2 (2014, 2015)
 FIBA 3x3 World Tour runner-up: 1 (2013)

References

External links
 

1988 births
Living people
Basketball players from Novi Sad
Serbian men's basketball players
Serbian men's 3x3 basketball players
Basketball players at the 2015 European Games
European Games medalists in basketball
KK Star players
FIBA 3x3 World Tour players
Small forwards
European Games bronze medalists for Serbia
European champions for Serbia